The qualification for the 2020 men's Olympic volleyball tournament allocated twelve teams quota spots: the hosts, the winners in each of the six pools of Intercontinental Qualifying Tournament, and five continental Olympic qualification tournament winners. Teams already qualified for the event are not eligible to play in the following qualification tournaments.

Qualification summary

Timeline

Pool standing procedure

For all qualification tournaments except North American qualification tournament

 Total number of victories (matches won, matches lost)
 In the event of a tie, the following first tiebreaker will apply: The teams will be ranked by the most points gained per match as follows:
Match won 3–0 or 3–1: 3 points for the winner, 0 points for the loser
Match won 3–2: 2 points for the winner, 1 point for the loser
Match forfeited: 3 points for the winner, 0 points (0–25, 0–25, 0–25) for the loser
 If teams are still tied after examining the number of victories and points gained, then the FIVB will examine the results in order to break the tie in the following order:
Sets quotient: if two or more teams are tied on the number of points gained, they will be ranked by the quotient resulting from the division of the number of all sets won by the number of all sets lost.
Points quotient: if the tie persists based on the sets quotient, the teams will be ranked by the quotient resulting from the division of all points scored by the total of points lost during all sets.
If the tie persists based on the points quotient, the tie will be broken based on the team that won the match of the Round Robin Phase between the tied teams. When the tie in points quotient is between three or more teams, these teams ranked taking into consideration only the matches involving the teams in question.

For North American qualification tournament only

 Total number of victories (matches won, matches lost)
 In the event of a tie, the following first tiebreaker will apply: The teams will be ranked by the most points gained per match as follows:
Match won 3–0: 5 points for the winner, 0 points for the loser
Match won 3–1: 4 points for the winner, 1 point for the loser
Match won 3–2: 3 points for the winner, 2 point for the loser
Match forfeited: 5 points for the winner, 0 points (0–25, 0–25, 0–25) for the loser
 If teams are still tied after examining the number of victories and points gained, then the NORCECA will examine the results in order to break the tie in the following order:
Points quotient: if two or more teams are tied on the number of points gained, they will be ranked by the quotient resulting from the division of all points scored by the total of points lost during all sets.
Sets quotient: if the tie persists based on the points quotient, the teams will be ranked by the quotient resulting from the division of the number of all sets won by the number of all sets lost.
If the tie persists based on the sets quotient, the tie will be broken based on the team that won the match of the Round Robin Phase between the tied teams. When the tie in sets quotient is between three or more teams, these teams ranked taking into consideration only the matches involving the teams in question.

Host country
FIVB reserved a berth for the 2020 Summer Olympics host country to participate in the tournament.

Intercontinental Olympic Qualification Tournaments
The winners in each pool qualified for the 2020 Summer Olympics.

Qualification round 
Twenty-four teams qualified for the competition as the top twenty-four teams of FIVB World Ranking on 1 October 2018 (except Japan who qualified as hosts for the 2020 Summer Olympics.).

Qualified teams

Final round

Means of qualification

Pool A

Pool B

Pool C

Pool D

Pool E

Pool F

Continental Olympic Qualification Tournaments

Africa
The winners in final round qualified for the 2020 Summer Olympics.

Qualified teams
of the 53 CAVB and IOC member associations, a total of 5 CAVB member national teams entered the qualifying stage. But, Ghana were disqualified for not arriving in Cairo until just before the beginning of the tournament. All of Ghana's matches were forfeited and Ghana were ranked in last place in the final standing.

Final round

Final round

Of the 4 qualified teams, only winners of this round qualified for the 2020 Summer Olympics.

Means of qualification

Round robin

Asia and Oceania
The winners in final round qualified for the 2020 Summer Olympics.

Qualified teams
Of the 61 AVC and IOC member associations, a total of 18 AVC member national teams entered the qualifying stage

Zonal qualification round

Inter-zonal qualification round

Final round

Notes
Teams in bold qualified for the next phase and final tournament.
(H): Qualification group hosts
Kazakhstan replaced Pakistan who withdrew from the final round.

Zonal qualification round
Of the 3 western zone teams, top two teams qualified to the next round.

Means of qualification

Western Asia

Inter-zonal qualification round

Of the 16 qualified teams, the top eight teams (excluding Japan) qualified for the next round.

Means of qualification

Pool A

Pool B

Pool C

Pool D

Pool G

Pool H

9th–12th places round

Note: Kazakhstan replaced Pakistan, who withdrew from the final round.

Final round

Of the 8 qualified teams, only the winners of this round qualified for the 2020 Summer Olympics.

Means of qualification

Pool A

Pool B

Final four

Europe
The winners in final round qualified for the 2020 Summer Olympics.

Qualification round
The hosts Germany and the top seven ranked teams from the CEV European Ranking as of 30 September 2019 which had not yet qualified to the 2020 Summer Olympics competed in the 2020 European Olympic Qualification Tournament.

Final round

Of the 8 qualified teams, only the winners of this round qualified for the 2020 Summer Olympics.

Means of qualification

Pool A

Pool B

Final four

North America
The winners in final round qualified for the 2020 Summer Olympics.

Qualified teams
Of the 35 NORCECA and IOC member associations, a total of 7 NORCECA member national teams entered the qualifying stage

Qualification round – NORCECA Champions Cup

Qualification round – NORCECA Championship

Final round

Notes
Teams in bold qualified for the next phase and final tournament.
(H): Qualification group hosts

Qualification round

The 2019 NORCECA Champions Cup champions and the top three teams from the 2019 NORCECA Championship which had not yet qualified to the 2020 Summer Olympics competed in the 2020 North American Olympic Qualification Tournament.

Means of qualification

NORCECA Champions Cup – Round robin

Source: NORCECA
(H) Host; (Q) Qualified to the phase indicated.

NORCECA Championship – Pool A

Source: NORCECA
(H) Host; (Q) Qualified to the phase indicated.

NORCECA Championship – Pool B

Source: NORCECA
(Q) Qualified to the phase indicated.

NORCECA Championship – Final round

Final round

Of the 4 qualified teams, only winners of this round qualified for the 2020 Summer Olympics.

Means of qualification

Round robin

Source: FIVB
(H) Host; (Q) Qualified to the phase indicated.

South America
The winners in final round qualified for the 2020 Summer Olympics.

Qualified teams
Of the 11 CSV and IOC member associations, a total of 8 CSV member national teams entered the qualifying stage

Qualification round

Final round

Notes
Teams in bold qualified for the next phase and final tournament.
(H): Qualification group hosts

Qualification round

The top four teams from the 2019 South American Championship which had not yet qualified to the 2020 Summer Olympics competed in the 2020 South American Olympic Qualification Tournament.

Means of qualification

Pool A

Pool B

5th–8th places round

Final round

Of the 4 qualified teams, only winners of this round qualified for the 2020 Summer Olympics.

Means of qualification

Round robin

References

Men
Qualification for the 2020 Summer Olympics
2020